Paul Arbaud (1832-1911) was a French book collector and philanthropist.

Early life
Paul Arbaud was born on March 27, 1832. His father, Edouard Arbaud, originally from Manosque, worked as a judge in Paris. His mother, Stéphanie Pasquier de Coulans, was the daughter of Jules-Paul Pasquier, the owner of the Château de Coulans and a Conseiller d'Etat, and the niece of Étienne-Denis Pasquier.

Collection
Arbaud joined the Académie d'Aix-en-Provence in 1883. He moved into a hôtel particulier on the rue du Quatre-Septembre in the Quartier Mazarin of Aix-en-Provence in 1884. He started a collection of plates, paintings and old books. He acquired the original copy of L'Histoire de s. Louis by historian Louis Antoine de Ruffi from Albert de Tollon in 1892. He eventually acquired about 1,600 old books.

Arbaud donated his collection to the Académie d'Aix-en-Provence on October 10, 1910.

Personal life, death and legacy
Arbaud married Adrienne de Robineau Valmont.

Arbaud died on March 17, 1911, in Aix-en-Provence. His hôtel particulier became known as the Musée Arbaud, home to his collection.

References

1832 births
1911 deaths
People from Aix-en-Provence
French book and manuscript collectors
20th-century French philanthropists
19th-century philanthropists